George Smith (born 7 October 1945) is an English former professional football midfielder.

Smith began his career with his local club Newcastle United although he failed to make the first team and left in March 1965 to join Barrow. He went on to play for Portsmouth, Middlesbrough, Birmingham City, Cardiff City and Swansea City, where he became a central figure in the club's growth, before finishing his career at Hartlepool United. Following his retirement as a player Smith joined the Hartlepool coaching staff. Later he became a scout for Stoke City.

References

1945 births
Living people
Footballers from Newcastle upon Tyne
English footballers
Association football midfielders
Newcastle United F.C. players
Barrow A.F.C. players
Portsmouth F.C. players
Middlesbrough F.C. players
Birmingham City F.C. players
Cardiff City F.C. players
Swansea City A.F.C. players
Hartlepool United F.C. players
English Football League players